Red Polished Ware may refer to several types of ancient pottery with a red or terracotta-coloured body:

El-Badari, Egypt c. 5500-4000 BC
Philia culture, Cyprus c. 2000 BC
Pottery of ancient Cyprus, Cyprus c. 2000 BC
Red Polished Ware (Gujarat), India c. 300 BC-1000 AD
Terra sigillata#Roman red gloss pottery (Samian ware) Rome; not capitalized

See also
Redware - various types of pottery with a red or terracotta-coloured body.